Warwick Prize may refer to:
 Warwick Prize for Women in Translation
 Warwick Prize for Writing